Asaf Bimro (born 1 January 1969) is a retired Israeli long-distance runner who specialized in the marathon.
 
He was an Ethiopian citizen until 1984 when he emigrated to Israel. His best finishes at the European or World Championships has been a 20th place at the 2002 European Championships, an 18th place at the 2001 World Championships and a 25th place at the 2006 European Championships. He also competed at the 1995 World Championships (without finishing the race), the 1997 World Championships, the 2003 World Championships, the 2004 Olympic Games, the 2005 World Championships, the 2005 World Half Marathon Championships and the 2007 World Championships.

His personal best times are 29:49.85 minutes in the 10,000 metres, achieved in May 1992 in Tel Aviv; 1:04:47 hours in the half marathon, achieved in March 1997 in Tel Aviv; and 2:14:52 hours in the marathon, achieved at the 2003 World Championships in Paris.

Achievements

References

External links
 

1969 births
Living people
Ethiopian Jews
Ethiopian emigrants to Israel
Citizens of Israel through Law of Return
Israeli male long-distance runners
Israeli male marathon runners
Athletes (track and field) at the 2004 Summer Olympics
Olympic athletes of Israel
Jewish Israeli sportspeople
World Athletics Championships athletes for Israel